Philippe Le Hardy de Beaulieu (27 October 1887 – 22 November 1942) was a Belgian épée and sabre fencer. He won a bronze medal at the 1906 Intercalated Games and the 1912 Summer Olympics.

References

External links
 

1887 births
1942 deaths
Belgian male sabre fencers
Belgian male épée fencers
Olympic fencers of Belgium
Olympic bronze medalists for Belgium
Olympic medalists in fencing
Medalists at the 1906 Intercalated Games
Medalists at the 1912 Summer Olympics
Fencers at the 1906 Intercalated Games
Fencers at the 1912 Summer Olympics
Fencers at the 1920 Summer Olympics
Viscounts of Belgium